Japheth is one of the sons of Noah in the Bible.

Japheth may also refer to:
 Japheth Kimutai (born 1978), Kenyan middle-distance runner
 Japhet Korir (born 1993), Kenyan long-distance runner and 2013 World Cross Country Champion
 Levi ben Japheth (11th century), Karaite Jewish scholar
 Israel Meyer Japhet (1818–1892), German cantor and grammarian
 Gilad Japhet, MyHeritage founder
 Maggott, a comic book superhero whose real name is Japheth